The Coșna (in its upper course also Coșnița) is a right tributary of the river Bancu in Romania. It flows into the Bancu near Valea Bancului.

Tributaries

The following rivers are tributaries to the river Coșna (from source to mouth):

Left: Dieciu, Pietriș, Diaca, Vâlta
Right: Zimbroaia, Netedu

References

Rivers of Romania
Rivers of Suceava County